Nicolas Pierre Ouédec (born 28 October 1971) is a retired French professional footballer who played as a striker.

Club career
Born in Lorient, Morbihan, Ouédec was a product of FC Nantes's famous youth academy. He made his Ligue 1 debuts at the age of 17. He finished joint-top scorer in the 1993–94 season, netting 20 goals to help his team qualify for the UEFA Cup as fifth; he added a further 18 the following season, and the Canaries won the seventh national championship of their history.

After two solid campaigns at Spain's RCD Espanyol, Ouédec moved to Paris Saint-Germain, and from there his career never improved: two-and-a-half seasons at Montpellier HSC (where he reformed, with little impact, Nantes' attacking trio which also comprised Patrice Loko and Reynald Pedros) and one with Belgian club R.A.A. Louviéroise with only nine goals combined. He retired from football after representing two sides in China, aged 32.

International career
A France international on seven occasions, Ouédec was, however, never selected for any major tournament's final stages. He earned his first cap on 29 May 1994, coming on as a 71st-minute substitute for Éric Di Meco in a 4–1 win against Japan for the Kirin Cup.

Post-retirement
After retiring, Ouédec worked as a youth system coordinator at Nantes, also buying a hotel in the city. He later settled in the Philippines with his wife, where he was involved in the meat packing industry business.

Honours
Nantes
French Division 1: 1994–95

Paris Saint-Germain
Trophée des Champions: 1998

Dalian Shide
Chinese Jia-A League: 2002

Shandong Luneng
Chinese FA Cup: 2004

References

External links

 

 

1971 births
Living people
Sportspeople from Lorient
French footballers
Association football forwards
France under-21 international footballers
France international footballers
Competitors at the 1993 Mediterranean Games
Mediterranean Games bronze medalists for France
Mediterranean Games medalists in football
Ligue 1 players
Ligue 2 players
FC Nantes players
Paris Saint-Germain F.C. players
Montpellier HSC players
La Liga players
RCD Espanyol footballers
Belgian Pro League players
R.A.A. Louviéroise players
Chinese Super League players
Dalian Shide F.C. players
Shandong Taishan F.C. players
French expatriate footballers
French expatriate sportspeople in Spain
Expatriate footballers in Spain
French expatriate sportspeople in Belgium
Expatriate footballers in Belgium
French expatriate sportspeople in China
Expatriate footballers in China
Footballers from Brittany